636 is one of the Arabic numerals in the 600 (number) range.  It may also refer to:
 the year 636
 the area code 636 in the United States
 a British fighter-trainer, the Avro 636, dating from the 1930s
 636 Erika, a minor planet orbiting the Sun and discovered in 1907
 the minuscule 636 (in  Gregory-Aland numbering) is a New Testament manuscript
 United Nations Security Council Resolution 636 from July 1989 regarding certain Palestinians deported from Israeli-occupied territories
 636cc versions of the Kawasaki ZX-6R